Potassium hydrogenoxalate is a salt with formula KHC2O4 or K+·HO2C-CO2−.  It is one of the most common salts of the hydrogenoxalate anion, and can be obtained by reacting potassium hydroxide with oxalic acid in 1:1 mole ratio.

The salt is also known as: potassium hydrogen oxalate, potassium bioxalate, acid potassium oxalate, or monobasic potassium oxalate.  In older literature, it was also called:  Salt of sorrel, sorrel salt, sel d'oseille, sal acetosella; or, inaccurately, salt of lemon (due to the similar acidic “lemony” taste of the edible common sorrel or garden sorrel)

Potassium hydrogenoxalate occurs in some plants, notably sorrel. It is a commercial product used in photography, marble grinding, and removing ink stains.

Properties
The anhydrous product is a white, odorless, crystalline solid, hygroscopic and soluble in water (2.5 g/100 g at room temperature). The solutions are basic. Below 50 °C the much less soluble "potassium tetraoxalate" • forms and precipitates out of solution.

The monohydrate KHC2O4·H2O starts losing the water at 100 °C.

The anhydrous salt was found to have remarkable elastic anisotropy, due to its crystal structure that consists of relatively rigid columns of hydrogen-bonded hydrogenoxalate anions, joined into sheets by ionic K–O bonds.

Toxicity
Potassium hydrogenoxalate is strongly irritating to eyes, mucoses and gastrointestinal tract.  It may cause cardiac failure and death.

See also
 Potassium bicarbonate
 Potassium hydrogenacetylenedicarboxylate

References

Potassium compounds
Oxalates